Edita Brychta is a Czech actress.

Early life 
Brychta began acting as a young child in the Czech film Kinoautomat, the world's first interactive movie, which was presented at Expo 67 in Montreal. At the age of 16, she joined London's National Theatre Youth Workshop and decided to pursue an acting career.

Career 
She trained at LAMDA and was signed by Ken McReddie. In the UK, Brychta went on to play Juliet in Romeo & Juliet, Ophelia in Hamlet, Desdemona in Othello, and Marguerite in the world premiere of Vaclav Havel's Largo Desolato, directed by Tom Stoppard.  She played Sybil Burlington in the award-winning West End production of Daisy Pulls It Off, produced by Andrew Lloyd Webber.

Brychta starred in TV series such as Maelstrom, Gentleman and Players, Lovejoy, and Taggart, as well as the award-winning The Escape (Border in the UK) and the BAFTA-nominated The Britoil Affair.

Brychta was cast in the role of Princess Diana in NBC's Behind The Palace Doors and moved to Los Angeles. She went on to be cast in roles alongside Julia Roberts in Conspiracy Theory, Jim Carrey in Man On The Moon, James Garner in The Rockford Files and Angela Lansbury in Murder She Wrote. She also acted alongside Stellan Skarsgård and Lena Olin in the Swedish film Friends.

She worked with directors Ronald Neame, Milos Forman, Richard Donner, and in Mark Rydell's Crime Of The Century for HBO with Isabella Rossellini and Stephen Rea.

In the Czech Republic, Brychta played in her native language in two films, including the lead role of Anna in Jan Sverak's Akumulator 1. She also starred in the French TV series Cinq Filles à Paris.

Brychta has done voice-over for animated films such as Ice Age: Continental Drift, Cosmos, and The Bunbury Tails, and features including The Bourne Identity, Pirates Of The Caribbean and Man of Steel, as the voice of the mother ship.

Brychta has voiced various video game characters including Natasha in Red Alert 3.  She has featured in radio plays for the BBC, including the critically acclaimed Me, Cheeta: My Life in Hollywood with John Malkovich.

Brychta has voiced audio books including Jane Goodall's Seeds of Hope and was nominated for an Audie for the trilogy, This Man. She performed a live narration for Leonard Bernstein's The Kaddish at Royce Hall in Los Angeles.

She featured in Daniel Deronda, A Room With a View, Watch on the Rhine, and the Tony-award-winning Oslo for LA Theater Works.

Personal life 
Brychta is married to producer David Ladd and has one daughter, Lauren Cassidy, by a previous marriage.

She has completed four open water swims from Alcatraz Island to San Francisco, the length of the Golden Gate Bridge three times, and the 10K distance from the Golden Gate Bridge to the Bay Bridge twice, winning numerous medals.

Filmography 
Kingdoms of Amalur: Reckoning (2012) ... (voice)
Star Wars: The Old Republic (2011) ... (voice)
Criminal Minds (2010) Season 6, Episode 11: 25 to Life ... Mrs. Stanworth
Undercovers (2010) Season 1, Episode 6: Xerex ... Londoner Wife
Doktor od jezera hrochu (2010) ... MUDr. Homolová
Ratchet & Clank Future: A Crack in Time (2009) ... (voice)
Destroy All Humans! 2: Make War Not Love (2006) ... (voice)
A Good Year (2006) ... (voice)
SOCOM 3 U.S. Navy SEALs (2005) (voice) .... COLDKILL
Vampire: The Masquerade – Bloodlines (2004) (voice) .... additional voices
Kingdom Under Fire: The Crusaders (2004) (voice)
James Bond 007: Everything or Nothing (2003) (voice)
Robin Hood: Defender of the Crown (2003) (voice) .... Maid Marian
Kingdom Under Fire: A War of Heroes (2001) (voice)
Spyro: Year of the Dragon (2000) (voice) .... Sheila the Kangaroo, Princess Ami of the Fairies
Man on the Moon (1999) .... Pig-Tailed Wrestler
Return to Krondor (1998) (voice)
One Night Stand (1997) .... Karen's Business Associate
Conspiracy Theory (1997) .... Henry Finch's Receptionist
Crime of the Century (1996) .... Gerta Henkel
The Rockford Files: Godfather Knows Best (1996) .... Katinka
Murder, She Wrote: Nan's Ghost (1995) .... Deirdre O'Bannon
Accumulator 1 (1994) .... Anna
The Britoil Affair (1993) .... Patricia Peters
Behind the Palace Doors (1993) .... Diana, Princess of Wales
Fergie & Andrew: Behind the Palace Doors (1992) .... Diana, Princess of Wales
Lovejoy: (1991) National Wealth Season 2 .... Melanie Ford
The Piglet Files (1991) Helen
Taggart: Rogues' Gallery (1990) .... Valerie Sinclair
The Secret Life of Ian Fleming (1990) .... Maya
Gentlemen and Players .... Jane Somerville (13 episodes, 1988–1989)
Friends (1988) .... Sally
Flying in the Branches (1988) .... Dana
Blind Justice (1988) .... Suzie de Villiers
Escape (1987) .... Eva
Galloping Galaxies!: Episode #2.4 (1986) .... Amazonia
Worlds Beyond: Guardian of the Past (1986) .... Birgitta
Call Me Mister: Humpty Dumpty (1986) .... Elizabeth Monk
Foreign Body (1986) .... Jean
Hot Metal: The Tell-Tale Head (1986).... Lady Deborah
Cinq filles à Paris (1986) (mini) TV Series
Maelstrom (1985) .... Ingrid Nilsen
Pericles, Prince of Tyre (1984) .... Antiochus's Daughter
Just Good Friends: Fatherly Advice (Season1 Episode4) (1983) .... Girl in Pub

See also 
Maelstrom (TV series)
Gentlemen and Players (TV series)
Accumulator 1
Lovejoy (TV Series) – Melanie Ford

References

External links 
 
 
 
 

Living people
Actresses from London
Actresses from Prague
Czechoslovak emigrants to England
Czech emigrants to England
English film actresses
English television actresses
English voice actresses
Year of birth missing (living people)